Jean Venturini (17 September 1919 – 17 June 1940) was a French poet and sailor. He died at the age of 20 during the Second World War when his submarine was lost in the Mediterranean Sea.

Biography 
Jean Venturini was born in Nabeul, Tunisia, and spent most of his childhood in Morocco. In his teens, he studied at a high school near Meknes. He began writing poetry at the age of 16, poems which were later collected and published in November 1939 as Outlines. This was to be his only published work. He was killed in June 1940, along with the entire crew of the submarine Morse, which had struck a mine. He had trained as a signaller before joining the French Navy in 1939.

Outlines is a collection of poems heavily influenced by the theories of poet Arthur Rimbaud. With its themes and writing, this work is very close to the surrealist aesthetic.

Works 

  Outlines, collection of poems, Casablanca, Éditions du Moghreb, November 1939, 80 p.
  Outlines : reissue with a biographical afterword on the sinking of the submarine « Morse », Paris, Vaillant, June 2009, 112 p.
 Scattered poems, not collected :
  Ballade d'un qui part, published in December 1939 by the review Fontaine
  Une Pierre dans l'eau, published in May 1940 by the review Poésie 40
  Victime d'affiches, unpublished manuscript poem, June 1940 (sent in a letter to a close friend)

Bibliography 
  Pierre Seghers, Le Livre d'or de la Poésie française, first volume : « Des origines à 1940 », Paris, Marabout, 1998, 488 p.
  Collective work, Dictionnaire des lettres françaises, sixth volume : « Le xxe siècle », Paris, LGF-Le Livre de Poche, 1998, 1174 p.
  « La mémoire engloutie », a study by Jean-Luc Falco, foreword to the reissue of Outlines
  Collective work, Anthologie des écrivains morts à la guerre, 1939-1945, Paris, Albin Michel, 1998, 808 p.

See also 
 List of French-language poets

References

External links 

 Article « Jean Venturini, marin mort pour la France et poète » by Madeleine Kérisit
 Monographie de Jean Venturini, inspired by Madeleine Kérisit, on website Mémorial national aux marins morts pour la France
 Homepage of the website Aux Marins
 Historical Service of the French Navy, bureau of Toulon

Surrealist poets
French sailors
1919 births
1940 deaths
20th-century French poets
French male poets
French Navy personnel of World War II
French military personnel killed in World War II
20th-century French male writers